The 1990–91 Biathlon World Cup was a multi-race tournament over a season of biathlon, organised by the UIPMB (Union Internationale de Pentathlon Moderne et Biathlon). The season started on 13 December 1990 in Albertville, France, and ended on 17 March 1991 in Canmore, Canada. It was the 14th season of the Biathlon World Cup.

Calendar
Below is the World Cup calendar for the 1990–91 season.

 1991 World Championship races were not included in the 1990–91 World Cup scoring system.
 The relays were technically unofficial races as they did not count towards anything in the World Cup.

World Cup Podium

Men

Women

Men's team

Women's team

Standings: Men

Overall 

Final standings after 12 races.

Individual 

Final standings after 6 races.

Sprint 

Final standings after 6 races.

Nation 

Final standings after 16 races.

Standings: Women

Overall 

Final standings after 12 races.

Individual 

Final standings after 6 races.

Sprint 

Final standings after 6 races.

Nation 

Final standings after 16 races.

Medal table

Achievements

Men
First World Cup career victory
, 24, in his 7th season — the WC 2 Individual in Ruhpolding; it also was his first podium
, 25, in his 2nd season — the WC 2 Sprint in Ruhpolding; first podium was the 1989–90 Sprint in Obertilliach
, 26, in his 7th season — the WC 5 Sprint in Holmenkollen; first podium was the 1987–88 Sprint in Holmenkollen
, 25, in his 6th season — the WC 6 Individual in Canmore; first podium was the 1987–88 Individual in Antholz-Anterselva

First World Cup podium
, 27, in his 8th season — no. 3 in the WC 3 Individual in Antholz-Anterselva
, 20, in his 1st season — no. 2 in the WC 4 Sprint in Oberhof
, 24, in his 4th season — no. 3 in the WC 5 Individual in Holmenkollen
, 26, in his 3rd season — no. 2 in the WC 6 Individual in Canmore
, 29, — no. 3 in the WC 6 Individual in Canmore
, 25, in his 5th season — no. 2 in the WC 6 Sprint in Canmore

Victory in this World Cup (all-time number of victories in parentheses)
, 3 (5) first places
, 2 (3) first places
, 1 (12) first place
, 1 (3) first place
, 1 (2) first place
, 1 (1) first place
, 1 (1) first place
, 1 (1) first place
, 1 (1) first place

Women
Victory in this World Cup (all-time number of victories in parentheses)
 , 2 (7) first places
 , 2 (4) first places
 , 2 (2) first places
 , 2 (2) first places
 , 1 (4) first place
 , 1 (1) first place
 , 1 (1) first place
 , 1 (1) first place

Retirements
Following notable biathletes retired after the 1990–91 season:

References

Biathlon World Cup
World Cup
World Cup